Grace Egan (born 1 June 2000) is an Australian rules footballer playing for Richmond in the AFL Women's (AFLW). She has previously played for Carlton.

AFLW career
After playing two years with Richmond's VFLW team, Egan was drafted by Carlton with their second selection and thirteenth overall in the 2019 AFL Women's draft. She made her debut against  at Ikon Park in the opening round of the 2020 season.

In June 2022, Egan was traded and returned to Richmond.

Statistics  
Statistics are correct to the end of round 3, 2021. 

|- style="background:#EAEAEA"
| scope="row" text-align:center | 2020
| 
| 1 || 7 || 2 || 1 || 50 || 50 || 100 || 14 || 32 || 0.3 || 0.1 || 7.1 || 7.1 || 14.2 || 2.0 || 4.6 || 2
|- 
| scope="row" text-align:center | 2021
| 
| 1 || 3 || 0 || 0 || 25 || 25 || 50 || 3 || 15 || 0.0 || 0.0 || 8.3 || 8.3 || 16.6 || 1.0 || 5.0 || 
|- class="sortbottom"
! colspan=3 | Career
! 10
! 2
! 1
! 75
! 75
! 150
! 17
! 47
! 0.2
! 0.1 
! 7.5
! 7.5 
! 15.0
! 1.7
! 4.7
! 2
|}

References

External links 

2000 births
Living people
Carlton Football Club (AFLW) players
Australian rules footballers from Melbourne
Murray Bushrangers players (NAB League Girls)